Biu is a town and a Local Government Area (LGA) in southern Borno State of Nigeria.  The town is the administrative center of the LGA and was once the capital of the Biu kingdom, and is now capital of the Biu Emirate. Biu lies on the Biu Plateau at an average elevation of 626 meters.
The region is semi-arid.

History

The name of Biu was initially called Viu which in Babur and Bura Language means high.

The Biu kingdom became established around 1670 in the reign of Mari Watila Tampta. King Mari Watirwa (r. 1793–1838), whose capital was near Biu at Kogu, defeated Fulani invaders from the Gombe Emirate to the west. In 1878 Mari Biya, became the first Babur king to rule from Biu. The emir's palace is now situated in the town.

With British rule, Biu division was created in 1918. Mai Ari Dogo was acknowledged as the first emir of Biu in 1920. The area became known as the Biu federation after 1957, when the districts of Shani and Askira were added to the emirate.
Maidalla Mustafa dan Muhammad (b. 1915) became Mai Biu, also styled Kuthli, in 1959.

People

The inhabitants of the region are mainly Babur and Bura people (also known as Pabir ), Tera, Bura, Marghi, Mina and Fulani people. Babur, Bura, Tera, Marghi and Mina are Biu–Mandara languages of the Chadic language group.

Geography and economy
The LGA is mostly located in the northern Guinea savannah (NGA) agroecological zone, with a small portion in the northeast, the Kimba area, lying in the dryer Sudan savannah zone. The economy is mixed agricultural, based on herding cattle, goats, sheep, horses, and donkeys and farming sorghum, millet, maize, cowpea, and cotton.  Agriculture consists mostly of small farms using traditional methods.

There is a small mining industry in Biu, with iron ore, gravel, magnesite, uranium, feldspar, topaz, mica, granite, aquamarine, nephelite, and salt being extracted.

, the Gombe-Biu-Mubi road was in poor repair. In early 2022, the area was earmarked to receive vital infrastructure funds from multiple international charities to improve transport links.

Communities
The Biu Local Government Area has a large number of rural communities in addition to Biu, which include:

Health
Malnutrition in southern Borno State is extensive. In 2005, Médecins Sans Frontières (MSF) set up an intensive care feeding center in Biu hospital, the main referral hospital for the region.
In October 2009 there was an outbreak of Cholera in the area, a disease that spreads through drinking contaminated water. About 600 people were rushed to the Biu General Hospital for diagnosis and treatment. The management of the hospital, in conjunction with the State Ministry of Health, decided to evacuate the patients to an isolated treatment camp.

References

Populated places in Borno State
Local Government Areas in Borno State